Landscape with a Red Cloud (Estonian: Maastik punase pilvega) is a painting by Estonian artist Konrad Mägi from 1913 to 1914.

Description
The painting's dimensions are 66.3 x 55 centimeters. It is in the collection of the Art Museum of Estonia and is exhibited in Kumu Art Museum.

Analysis
Stephen Farthing added it to his book 1001 Paintings You Must See Before You Die, published in 2008.

References 

1913 paintings
Collections of the Art Museum of Estonia
Estonian paintings